Veurey-Voroize is a commune in the Isère department in southeastern France. It is part of the Grenoble urban unit (agglomeration).

Population

See also
Parc naturel régional du Vercors

References

Communes of Isère
Isère communes articles needing translation from French Wikipedia